HMS Scorpion was a Dutch hoy that the Admiralty purchased in 1794. She was commissioned into the Royal Navy in March 1794 under Lieutenant Thomas Crocker for the Channel Islands. She and several of her sister ships (and ), formed part of a short-lived squadron under Philippe d'Auvergne at Jersey. 

She was paid off in 1795, but recommissioned in September under Lieutenant George Bell. In June 1799 Lieutenant William Osborn assumed command. She was at Poole in 1801 and 1802.

The navy sold her in November 1804 at Portsmouth.

Citations

References
 

Hoys of the Royal Navy
1790s ships